This is a partial list of Non-governmental organization (NGOs) based in Karachi, Sindh, Pakistan.

See also
 List of NGOs in Pakistan

External links
 List of NGOs Based in Karachi
 List of NGOs in Pakistan

Organisations based in Karachi
Karachi-related lists